Tvoje lice zvuči poznato is the Croatian version of Your Face Sounds Familiar. It first aired on 18 March 2018, and concluded the run on 10 June 2018. The previous judges (actor Goran Navojec, vocalist Sandra Bagarić and musician Tomo in der Mühlen) have left the show and have been replaced by the winners of the previous four seasons.

Format
The show challenges celebrities (singers and actors) to perform as different iconic music artists every week, which are chosen by the show's "Randomiser". They are then judged by the panel of celebrity judges. Each celebrity gets transformed into a different singer every week, and performs an iconic song and dance routine well known by that particular singer. The Randomiser can choose any older or younger artist available in the machine, even a singer of the opposite sex, or a deceased singer. In third season (Week 3), ability to use a joker was introduced. If celebrity wasn't happy with the Randomiser's output or thought that the task is too hard, they could ask some other celebrity to perform instead of them, but just once per season. It was announced that the show will get even more new content in the fourth season, but the 'Joker' ability was removed. The new content in the fourth season was the introduction of holographic performances. If the "Randomiser" chooses a celebrity should perform a duet, they can do it using the pre-recorded hologram for one of the given singers. In the fifth season, celebrity contestant can perform as another celebrity with a child transformed in the same celebrity. The child-contestant duo acts include: Damir Poljicak & David Bojcic as Elvis Presley, Davor Dretar & Ivor Leskovar as Will Smith, Paola Valic Bekic & Tara Roki as Taylor Swift, Amel Curic & Vito Ljubicic as Miso Kovac, Maja Bajamic & Elena Brnic as Beyonce Knowles, Marko Knesaurek & Ursula Divosevic as Katy Perry, Katarina Baban & Gabrijel Rodic as Bruno Mars, and Ana Vilenica & Eva Biljan as Whitney Houston. The winner of every episode gets to donate 10 000 HRK, while the overall leader gets to donate 40 000 HRK at the end of the season. The show lasts for 13 weeks.

Voting
The contestants are awarded points from the judges (and each other) based on their singing and dance routines. Judges award from 4 to 12 - excluding 11 - points to each contestant. After that, each contestant gives 5 points to a fellow contestant of their choice (known as "Bonus" points). In week 12 (semi-final week), four contestants with the highest number of votes will qualify to the final. In week 13 (grand final), previous points will be transformed into a 4-7 system, the jury will award from 8 to 12 points, and contestants will give 5 points to a fellow contestant of their choice.

Judges
Nives Celzijus - Croatian actress and singer.
Saša Lozar - Croatian singer.
Mario Petreković - Croatian comedian and actor.
Damir Kedžo - Croatian singer.

Contestants

Color key:
 indicates the winning contestant that week
 indicates the contestant with fewest points that week
 indicates the series winner
 indicates the series runner-up

Performance chart

Color key:
 indicates the contestant came first that week
 indicates the contestant came second that week
 indicates the contestant came last that week

Week 1
Aired: March 18, 2018  Winner: Maja Bajamić

Opening act

Bonus points
Katarina gave five points to Maja Bajamić
Amel gave five points to Maja Bajamić
Matko gave five points to Katarina Baban
Davor gave five points to Damir Poljičak
Maja gave five points to Damir Poljičak
Ana gave five points to Maja Bajamić
Damir gave five points to Paola Valić Bekić
Paola gave five points to Katarina Baban

Week 2
Aired: March 25, 2018  Winner:  Amel Ćurić

Bonus points
Katarina gave five points to Davor Dretar Drele
Amel gave five points to Paola Valić Bekić
Matko gave five points to Davor Dretar Drele
Davor gave five points to Amel Ćurić
Maja gave five points to Amel Ćurić
Ana gave five points to Amel Ćurić
Damir gave five points to Amel Ćurić
Paola gave five points to Amel Ćurić

Week 3
Aired: April 1, 2018  Winner:  Damir Poljičak

Bonus points
Katarina gave five points to Ana Vilenica
Amel gave five points to Damir Poljičak
Matko gave five points to Damir Poljičak
Davor gave five points to Matko Knešaurek
Maja gave five points to Damir Poljičak
Ana gave five points to Damir Poljičak
Damir gave five points to Matko Knešaurek
Paola gave five points to Damir Poljičak

Week 4
Aired: April 8, 2018  Winner:  Ana Vilenica

Bonus points
Katarina gave five points to Matko Knešaurek
Amel gave five points to Ana Vilenica
Matko gave five points to Ana Vilenica
Davor gave five points to Ana Vilenica
Maja gave five points to Ana Vilenica
Ana gave five points to Davor Dretar Drele
Damir gave five points to Ana Vilenica
Paola gave five points to Ana Vilenica

Week 5
Aired: April 15, 2018  Winner: Davor Dretar Drele

Bonus points
Katarina gave five points to Damir Poljičak
Amel gave five points to Davor Dretar Drele
Matko gave five points to Davor Dretar Drele
Davor gave five points to Maja Bajamić
Maja gave five points to Davor Dretar Drele
Ana gave five points to Katarina Baban
Damir gave five points to Ana Vilenica
Paola gave five points to Maja Bajamić

Week 6 
Aired: April 22, 2018  Winner:  Paola Valić Bekić 

Bonus points
Katarina gave five points to Paola Valić Bekić
Amel gave five points to Paola Valić Bekić
Matko gave five points to Paola Valić Bekić
Davor gave five points to Katarina Baban
Maja gave five points to Paola Valić Bekić
Ana gave five points to Paola Valić Bekić
Damir gave five points to Paola Valić Bekić
Paola gave five points to Amel Ćurić

Week 7
Aired: April 29, 2018  Winner:  Matko Knešaurek

Bonus points
Katarina gave five points to Amel Ćurić
Amel gave five points to Matko Knešaurek
Matko gave five points to Paola Valić Bekić
Davor gave five points to Maja Bajamić
Maja gave five points to Paola Valić Bekić
Ana gave five points to Matko Knešaurek
Damir gave five points to Davor Dretar Drele
Paola gave five points to Maja Bajamić

Week 8
Aired: May 6, 2018  Winner:  Maja Bajamić

Bonus points
Katarina gave five points to Ana Vilenica
Amel gave five points to Maja Bajamić
Matko gave five points to Amel Ćurić
Davor gave five points to Maja Bajamić
Maja gave five points to Ana Vilenica
Ana gave five points to Maja Bajamić
Damir gave five points to Maja Bajamić
Paola gave five points to Maja Bajamić

Week 9
Aired: May 13, 2018  Winner:  Katarina Baban

Bonus points
Katarina gave five points to Paola Valić Bekić
Amel gave five points to Katarina Baban
Matko gave five points to Katarina Baban
Davor gave five points to Katarina Baban
Maja gave five points to Paola Valić Bekić
Ana gave five points to Katarina Baban
Damir gave five points to Katarina Baban
Paola gave five points to Damir Poljičak

Week 10
Aired: May 20, 2018  Winner:  Paola Valić Bekić

Bonus points
Katarina gave five points to Matko Knešaurek
Amel gave five points to Paola Valić Bekić
Matko gave five points to Katarina Baban
Davor gave five points to Matko Knešaurek
Maja gave five points to Paola Valić Bekić
Ana gave five points to Paola Valić Bekić
Damir gave five points to Katarina Baban
Paola gave five points to Maja Bajamić

Week 11
Aired: May 27, 2018  Winner:  Amel Ćurić

Bonus points
Paola gave five points to Matko Knešaurek
Amel gave five points to Paola Valić Bekić
Matko gave five points to Ana Vilenica
Davor gave five points to Ana Vilenica
Maja gave five points to Amel Ćurić
Ana gave five points to Maja Bajamić
Damir gave five points to Amel Ćurić
Katarina gave five points to Amel Ćurić

Week 12
Aired: June 3, 2018  Winner:  Maja Bajamić

Bonus points
Paola gave five points to Amel Ćurić
Amel gave five points to Damir Poljičak
Matko gave five points to Maja Bajamić
Davor gave five points to Amel Ćurić
Maja gave five points to Davor Dretar
Ana gave five points to Matko Knešaurek
Damir gave five points to Amel Ćurić
Katarina gave five points to Maja Bajamić

Week 13 - Final
Aired: June 10, 2018  Winner: Maja Bajamić

See also
Tvoje lice zvuči poznato (Croatian TV series)
Tvoje lice zvuči poznato (Croatian season 1)
Tvoje lice zvuči poznato (Croatian season 2)
Tvoje lice zvuči poznato (Croatian season 3)
Tvoje lice zvuči poznato (Croatian season 4)

References

Croatia
2018 Croatian television seasons